Ana Rovita (born 30 March 1991) is an Indonesian badminton player affiliated with Djarum club.

Achievements

Asian Junior Championships 
Girls' singles

BWF International Challenge/Series (1 title, 3 runners-up) 
Women's singles

  BWF International Challenge tournament
  BWF International Series tournament
  BWF Future Series tournament

References

External links 
 

1991 births
Living people
People from Jepara
Sportspeople from Central Java
Indonesian female badminton players
21st-century Indonesian women
20th-century Indonesian women